Pear and Sister Pinecone is a double-EP released on Fall Records by Maryland-based indie folk band Page France.

The label has since announced that no more of the EP set will be produced, resulting in an unintentional limited release of 1,000.

Track listing

Pear
"Million Man Money Hand" - 2:09
"All Things, All Right" - 3:39
"Talking Out-Louds" - 2:33
"Ladder Man" - 3:24
"The Saddest Ones" - 2:25
"Young One" - 3:10
"Everybody Knows" - 4:28
"Say Wolf In The Summertime" - 2:58

Sister Pinecone
"Mother" - 3:38
"No One Likes a Bleeder" - 2:33
"Weatherman, Section One" - 2:20
"Weatherman, Section Three" - 2:39
"Passengers Laughing" - 2:19
"Antarctica (My Beloved Home)" - 3:06

Notes

External links
Pear review on AbsolutePunk.net
Sister Pinecone review on AbsolutePunk.net

2006 albums
Page France albums